Aníbal Cristobo (born September 1, 1971, Lanús, Buenos Aires) is an Argentine writer. Published poems and poetry books, as well as collaborations as editor.

Biography
Cristobo lived six years in Rio de Janeiro, where he published his first works.

He moved to Barcelona in 2002.

Cristobo has since then published Castilian and Portuguese language books of poetry, and has been working in other media.

He received awards for literature in Spain. In 2009 he began to publish poems and drawings online.

Works
His latest works were published in digital form:

Deutschkurs (2008)
Krillsongs : en vivo en Berlín (2007)

Books
 Teste da Iguana (1997); Poemas
 Jet-lag (2002); Poemas
 Krill (2002); Poemas
 Miniaturas Kinéticas (2005); Recopilacion

Poems

Jet-Lag (2002)

 Una Ballena Blanca (Check-In)
 Última Cena En Buenos Aires
 Millas Que Cuenta, Describe Así (Mariana Bustelo)
 Melatonina
 Jet-Lag (Rio de Janeiro)
 Sulfur
 Lo Que Piensa El Contacto (Voces Del 23) - (Carlito Azevedo)
 Jet-Lag (Lisboa)
 Chica Jet-Lager (The Yorimichi Dog) - (Andi Nachon)
 Jet-Lag (Barcelona)
 Una Ballena Blanca (Desembarque)
 + Extras: Contagio (Inédito)
 + Extras: Epilamvanein (Inédito)
 + Extras: TraumatismoS (Inédito)

Krill (2002)
 + Krill (2002)
 Ñandú
 Cielo Del Siamés
 Hija Del Pastizal
 Jonestown 1978
 El Oso
 Hija Del Pastizal (Western Version)
 Dos Al Borde Del Estanque
 Playa De Invierno
 Dos Fotos De Kathy En Necochea
 Junco De La Intuición
 Ghost Writer
 Hija Del Pastizal (Un Ruido Más Allá)
 Sonido
 Krill (El Sueño Del Buzo)
 Los Ladrones
 Crustácea
 Los Animales Viejos
 La Tibia Muerte De Carl
 Hija Del Pastizal (Caribbean Version)
 Krill (El Noticiero De La Tarde)
 Atrape Al Asesino (19 Sospechosos)
 3:40 A.M.: K. Y La Chica Indiana En El Denver
 Tema De Amor De Krill
 Distancias Inconmensurables
 Negativo Del Asesino
 Hija Del Pastizal (Una Canción)
 Sombra De La Jirafa
 El Asesino
 Krill (Caja Oscura)
 Lago
 Hija Del Pastizal (Manga Version)
 Finn
 Krill (Diez Segundos Finales)
 El Asesino (Las Otras Voces)
 Ningún Viaje
 Una Muchacha Pálida
 El Asesino (Gas Lacrimógeno)
 Hija Del Pastizal (Galactic Version)
 Krill (Una Perla)
 + Extras: The Old Men Admiring Themselves In The Water (W. B. Yeats)
 + Extras: Distâncias Incomensuráveis Ii (Lu Menezes)
 + Extras: Sobre Una Fotonovela De Felipe Nepomuceno (Carlito Azevedo)
 + Extras: Conversación Incidental (Inédito)

Test De La Iguana (1997)
 + Test De La Iguana (1997)
 Los Gatos De John Cage
 Cielo Del Allatolah
 Ezster
 Vaimer
 No Deberías Haber Hecho Eso
 Off
 Amuleto
 Test De La Iguana
 Ufo, Agosto Del '75
 Guajiro Killer
 Bloody Mary
 Gruta De Los VampiroS
 Playing Cards
 Single Cacto
 Aljibe
 Puzzle De Montañas Chinas
 Las Operaciones De La Libertad
 Virgin
 Single Cacto Ii
 Otro Pasajero Húngaro
 + Extras: Los Gatos De Merce Cunningham (Eduardo Jorge)

References

External links
 Publicaciones periodicas de Cristobo en internet
 dedicado a anibal Cristobo
 reportaje a Anibal Cristobo en portugues
 Miniaturas Kineticas completo publicado en internet en PDF

1971 births
People from Buenos Aires Province
20th-century Argentine poets
20th-century Argentine male writers
Argentine male poets
Living people
21st-century Argentine poets
21st-century Argentine male writers
Portuguese-language writers